The 2010 IIHF InLine Hockey World Championship Division I was the eighth IIHF InLine Hockey World Championship Division I, an annual international inline hockey tournament. It took place between 28 June and 4 July in Sweden. The games were played in the Färjestads Ishall in Karlstad, with the medal games played in the Löfbergs Lila Arena in Karlstad. Austria won the final against Croatia.

Venues

Nations
The following eight nations qualified for the Division I tournament. One nation from Asia, one nation from Australia, four nations from Europe, and two nations from South America were represented.

Asia

Australia

Europe

South America

Seeding and groups

The seeding in the preliminary round was based on the final standings at the 2009 IIHF InLine Hockey World Championship, 2009 IIHF InLine Hockey World Championship Division I, and 2010 IIHF InLine Hockey World Championship Division I Qualification. The teams were grouped accordingly by seeding at the previous year's tournament (in parenthesis is the corresponding seeding):

Group C
 (9)
 (12)
 (13)
 (16)

Group D
 (10)
 (11)
 (14)
 (15)

Rosters

Each team's roster for the 2010 IIHF InLine Hockey World Championship Division I consisted of at least 8 skaters (forwards, and defencemen) and 2 goaltenders, and at most 16 skaters and 3 goaltenders.

Preliminary round
Eight participated teams were placed in the following two groups. After playing a round-robin, the top team in each group advanced to the Qualification Games. The last three teams in each group competed in the Playoff Round.

All games were played at the Färjestads Ishall in Karlstad.

Group C

All times are local (UTC+2).

Group D

All times are local (UTC+2).

Qualification games

Playoff round

Bracket

Quarter-finals
All times are local (UTC+2).

Placement

5/6 placement
Time is local (UTC+2).

7/8 placement
Time is local (UTC+2).

Semi-finals
All times are local (UTC+2).

Bronze medal game
Time is local (UTC+2).

Gold medal game
Time is local (UTC+2).

Ranking and statistics

Final standings
The final standings of the tournament according to IIHF:

Tournament Awards
Best players selected by the directorate:
Best Goalkeeper:  Bernhard Starkbaum
Best Defenseman:  Viktor Tokaji
Best Forward:  Tomislav Grozaj

Scoring leaders
List shows the top skaters sorted by points, then goals. If the list exceeds 10 skaters because of a tie in points, all of the tied skaters are shown.
GP = Games played; G = Goals; A = Assists; Pts = Points; +/− = Plus/minus; PIM = Penalties in minutes; POS = PositionAsterisk (*) denotes that the player's team was demoted to Division I after the qualification games.
Source: IIHF.com
18:01, 4 July 2010 (UTC)

Leading goaltenders
Only the top five goaltenders, based on save percentage, who have played 40% of their team's minutes are included in this list.
TOI = Time On Ice (minutes:seconds); SA = Shots against; GA = Goals against; GAA = Goals against average; Sv% = Save percentage; SO = ShutoutsAsterisk (*) denotes that the player's team was demoted to Division I after the qualification games. Two asterisks (**) denote that the player's team was promoted to the Championship Division after the qualification games.
Source: IIHF.com
17:48, 4 July 2010 (UTC)

See also
2010 IIHF InLine Hockey World Championship
2009 IIHF InLine Hockey World Championship Division I
2011 IIHF InLine Hockey World Championship Division I

References

IIHF InLine Hockey World Championship
International sports competitions hosted by Sweden
2010 in inline hockey
2010 in Swedish sport
Sports competitions in Karlstad
Inline hockey in Sweden